Gavin Smith may refer to:

Gavin Smith (poker player) (1968–2019), Canadian professional poker player
Gavin Smith (author), science fiction writer who collaborates with Stephen Deas as Gavin Deas
Gavin Smith (racing driver) (born 1977), auto racing driver
Gavin Smith (footballer, born 1915) (1915–1992), footballer for Dumbarton and Barnsley
Gavin Smith (film studio executive) (1954–2014), American actor, film studio executive, and basketball player
Gavin Smith (Australian footballer) (born 1947), Australian rules footballer